Lost in the Stars is the 1974 film version of the Kurt Weill-Maxwell Anderson musical adaptation of the Alan Paton novel Cry, the Beloved Country.  The film was produced and released as part of the American Film Theatre, which adapted theatrical works for a subscription-driven cinema series.

Plot
Directed by Daniel Mann, the film follows a Zulu preacher, Reverend Stephen Kumalo (Brock Peters), in his journey to Johannesburg to search for his long-missing son, Absalom (Clifton Davis). He discovers his son is a paroled felon living in a shantytown with his pregnant girlfriend (Melba Moore). Absolom becomes involved in a robbery plan that results in the death of a white anti-apartheid advocate.  Absolom is jailed, tried and sentenced to death, leaving his father unable to continue his ministerial work.

Cast

Production

Due to the film's criticism of the apartheid system, it could not be shot on location in South Africa, requiring exterior footage to be shot in Cottage Grove, Oregon.

Critical response

Lost in the Stars has been poorly received by critics. At the time of its release, Vincent Canby of The New York Times called it "a very bad movie" and questioned why the film version dropped the reconciliation between Reverend Kumalo and the murdered man's father, which was integral to the Paton novel and the original stage version.

When the film was released on DVD in 2003, its received more unfavorable reviews. Time Out New York called it "a series of well-intentioned clichés" while Film Threat stated it was "not the missing classic that one hopes it could be."

See also
 List of American films of 1974

References

External links 
 
 
 Lost in the Stars on Floormic.com

Apartheid films
1974 films
1970s musical films
American musical films
Films shot in Oregon
Cottage Grove, Oregon
Films directed by Daniel Mann
Films produced by Ely Landau
Films based on musicals
Films based on adaptations
1970s English-language films
1970s American films